C-JeS Entertainment is a South Korean entertainment company established in 2009 that handles the management of various artists. Its roster includes popular boy band JYJ; singer Gummy; actors Sol Kyung-gu, Ryu Jun-yeol, and Lee Jae-wook; and actresses Moon So-ri, Ra Mi-ran, Uhm Ji-won, Hwang Jung-eum, and Kang Hye-jung.

History
The agency was established to meet the management needs of Jaejoong, Junsu and Yoochun, former members of TVXQ, after the trio filed a lawsuit against their former record label, S.M. Entertainment. The singers met Baek Chang-jou in mid-2009, not long after they filed the lawsuit. C-JeS was established shortly after that.  Baek has directly said in the interview that C-JeS was established solely because of JYJ. Baek invested heavily in building the newly created band, JYJ's image and credibility after the Korean entertainment industry closed its doors on the artists perceived as "rebels" for going against their previous management.

On 8 March 2013, actor Lee Jung-jae signed on to be exclusively managed by C-JeS Entertainment. He reportedly chose C-Jes after working with Song Ji-hyo in movie New World.

On 29 August 2014, C-JeS Entertainment signed actress-singer Hwang Jung-eum.

On 10 July 2015, Song Ji-hyo ended her contract with C-JeS Entertainment after 4 years.

On 28 April 2021, C-JeS Entertainment signed actor Lee Jae-wook.

Roster

Recording artists

Groups

Noel

Soloists
Kim Jae-joong
Gummy
Crucial Star
Solji

Actors/Actresses

 Cha Ji-yeon
 Chae Shi-ra
 Hong Jong-hyun
 Hwang Jung-eum
 Hwang Seung-eon
 Jin Ji-hee
 Jin Hee-kyung
 Jin Hyuk
 Jo Sung-ha
 Jung Seonah
 Jung Suk-won
 Kang Hong-seok
 Kim Myung-min
 Kim Yoo-ri
 Kang Hye-jung
 Kwon Na-ra
 Kim Jae-joong
 Lee Jae-wook
 Lee Joo-yeon 
 Lee Re
 Min Do-hee
 Moon So-ri
 Oh Dal-su
 Oh Ha-ni 
 Park Byung-eun
 Park Sung-woong
 Park Ye-young
 Ra Mi-ran
 Ryu Jun-yeol
 Ryu Ui-hyun
 Sol Kyung-gu
 Song Il-gook
 Uhm Ji-won
 Teo Yoo
 Yoon Ji-hye

Production people

Directors
Hur Jin-ho

Screenwriters
 Chun Myo-jung
 Hwang Eun-kyung
 Hwang Min-ah
 Jo Won-ki
 Kim Sun-deok
 Kwon Ki-young
 Noh Ji-seol
 Yoon In-na
 Yoon Young-mi

Former

Former artists
JYJ (2010–2022)
Yoochun (2010–2019)
Junsu (2010–2021)

Former actors/actresses

 Choi Min-sik (2013–2021)
 Choi Ro-woon
 Ha Seok-jin (2019–2021)
 Im Se-mi (2015–2018)
 Ji Il-joo (2020–2021)
 Jung In-sun (20??–2020)
 Kim Hye-eun 
 Kim Junsu (2010–2021)
 Kim Kang-woo (2014–2017)
 Kim Nam-gil (2018–2020)
 Kim Sun-a (2015–2017)
 Kwak Do-won (2014–2018)
 Lee Beom-soo (2014–2015)
 Lee Bong-ryun (20??–2021)
 Lee Chung-ah (2015–2018)
 Lee Jung-jae (2013–2016)
 Lee Re (2012–2021)
 Lee Soo-kyung (2019–2021)
 Park Joo-mi (2014–2019)
 Park Yu-hwan (2011–2021)
 Ryu Hye-young (2014–2018)
 Shin Hyeon-seung (2021)
 Song Ji-hyo (2011–2015)
 Song Sae-byeok (20??–2018)
 Yoon Sang-hyun

Productions

TV series
 Sungkyunkwan Scandal (KBS 2TV, 2010) (with RaemongRaein Co., Ltd.)
 Miss Ripley (MBC TV, 2011) (with Curtain Call Media)
 Three Days (SBS TV, 2014) (with Golden Thumb Pictures)
 Bubbly Lovely (SBS TV, 2016)
 Welcome to Waikiki (JTBC, 2018) (with JTBC Studios)
 Switch (SBS TV, 2018)
 Mung Bean Flower (SBS TV, 2019)
 Welcome to Waikiki 2 (JTBC, 2019) (with JTBC Studios)
 Shady Mom-in-Law (SBS TV, 2019) (with SBS Plus)
 Lost (JTBC, 2021) (with Drama House)
 Hometown (tvN, 2021) (with Studio Dragon)
 Link: Eat, Love, Kill (tvN, 2022) (with Studio Dragon and Arc Media)
 Drama Stage: Find the 1st Prize (tvN, 2022) (with Studio Dragon)
 Casino (Disney+ Star Original, 2022) (with B.A. Entertainment and Arc Media)

Stage and musical
 Dracula, the Musical (2014) (with OD Musical Company)
 Death Note, the Musical (2015)
 A New Musical, Dorian Gray (2016)
 Death Note, the Musical (2017)
 Dracula, the Musical (2020)

Notes

References

External links
 
 

Talent agencies of South Korea
Television production companies of South Korea
Entertainment companies established in 2009
South Korean companies established in 2009